is a Japanese Olympic trampoline gymnast. She competed at the 2004 and 2008 Summer Olympics.

References

1984 births
Living people
People from Minoh, Osaka
Japanese female trampolinists
Gymnasts at the 2004 Summer Olympics
Gymnasts at the 2008 Summer Olympics
Olympic gymnasts of Japan
Sportspeople from Osaka Prefecture